Tim Lawrence is a British author. He is Professor of Cultural Studies at the University of East London.

Books
Love Saves the Day: A History of American Dance Music Culture, 1970-79 (Duke University Press, 2004)
Hold On to Your Dreams: Arthur Russell and the Downtown Music Scene, 1973-92 (Duke University Press, 2009)
Life and Death on the New York Dance Floor (Duke University Press, 2016)

References

External links

21st-century British male writers
Year of birth missing (living people)
Living people
Place of birth missing (living people)
21st-century British non-fiction writers
Academics of the University of East London